The 1948–49 Scottish Cup was the 64th staging of Scotland's most prestigious football knockout competition. The Cup Final was played at Hampden Park on 23 April 1949 between Rangers and Clyde. Rangers defeated Clyde 4–1 to win the Cup.

First round

Replays

Second round

Replays

Third round

Quarter-finals

Semi-finals

Replays

Final

Teams

See also
1948–49 in Scottish football
1948–49 Scottish League Cup

References

External links
 Video highlights from official Pathé News archive

Scottish Cup seasons
1948–49 in Scottish football
Scot